City of Gold and other stories from the Old Testament is a collection of 33 Old Testament Bible stories retold for children by Peter Dickinson, illustrated by Michael Foreman, and published by Victor Gollancz Ltd in 1980. The British Library Association awarded Dickinson his second Carnegie Medal recognising the year's outstanding children's book by a British subject and highly commended Foreman for the companion Kate Greenaway Medal.

City of Gold is a "radical" retelling of Bible stories, according to the retrospective online Carnegie Medal citation. "It is set in a time before the Bible was written down, when its stories were handed from generation to generation by the spoken word."

U.S. editions by Pantheon Books (New York, 1980) and Otter Books (Boston, 1992) retained Foreman's illustrations.

Origin

Dickinson described the origin and development of particular story books to the Children's Literature Association when he received the retrospective Phoenix Award for Eva in 2008. With City of Gold, for instance, he was "asked to re-tell the stories of the Old Testament, which I did in the different voices of different people telling the stories for specific purposes while they still existed only in the oral tradition." The request and its deliberate fulfillment place the book near the "commissioned" end of the spectrum. Some others "begin with only what you might call the idea of an idea, a hunch, that there might be a book in them thar hills".

His editor Joanna Goldsworthy at Gollancz made the request, he recalls, for a series of retellings illustrated by Foreman in which fairy tales by Hans Christian Andersen and folk tales collected by the Brothers Grimm had already been done. He declined and argued against the project, because there is no voice today for such retelling and because of the sharp contrast between stories "for amusement with glossy illustrations" and stories still "part of many people's deeply held convictions". But he found the multiple "imagined voices of people who had passionately believed in them." He acknowledges Rudyard Kipling for the technique.

Reception 

Some librarians criticised the Carnegie award to Dickinson, wondering in the pages of the contemporary Literary Association Record why the panel of Library Association judges so often chose books that no "ordinary" child would read. Panelist Vivian Griffiths responded that popularity with children was not a criterion; the point was literary merit.

See also

Notes

References

External links
  

1980 short story collections
Children's short story collections
Carnegie Medal in Literature winning works
Books based on the Bible
Novels by Peter Dickinson
Victor Gollancz Ltd books
1980 children's books